Socioeconomic mobility in the United Kingdom refers to the ability or inability of citizens of the UK to move from one socio-economic class to another.

History
The NRS developed the NRS social grade in order to decide which type of advertising would attract different types of readers. This has been added to by the National Statistics Socio-economic Classification.

Research
The Social Mobility and Child Poverty Commission has commissioned studies on social mobility in the UK, as has the Sutton Trust.

See also
 Economic history of the United Kingdom
 Income in the United Kingdom
 North–South divide in the United Kingdom
 Three-component theory of stratification

References

External links
 2015 UK Government report

 
Economy of the United Kingdom
Demographic history of the United Kingdom
United Kingdom